SV Grödig is an Austrian football club which is based in Grödig. During the 2014/15 campaign they will be competing in the following competitions: Austrian Bundesliga, Austrian Cup, UEFA Europa League.

Austrian Bundesliga

ÖFB Cup

Europa League Qualification

External links
Official site
Worldfootball.net profile
SV Grödig  at weltfussballarchiv.com

SV Grodig
1948 establishments in Austria